Richard Must (fl. 1307) was an English politician.

He was a Member (MP) of the Parliament of England for New Shoreham in 1307.

References

13th-century births
14th-century deaths
English MPs 1307